The Hsinchu City Fire Museum is a museum about firefighting in North District, Hsinchu City, Taiwan.

History
The museum building was originally built as a fire station in 1937. The building was then converted into a museum in order to preserve the historic value of the fire station as well as to introduce a series of historical and cultural relics related to fire safety. It was opened to the public on 7 June 2002.

Exhibitions

First floor
 Service Counter
 Exhibition Hall
 Area of Fire Fighting
 Area of Fire System
 Area of Escape Experiences

Second floor
 Exhibition Hall
 Display of Ignition Sources
 Multimedia Area
 Dynamic Exhibitions of Life Saving Models

Transportation
The museum is accessible within walking distance northwest from Hsinchu Station of the Taiwan Railways.

See also
 List of museums in Taiwan
 Fire museum

References

External links

 

2002 establishments in Taiwan
Defunct fire stations
Firefighting museums in Taiwan
Fire stations completed in 1937
Fire stations in Taiwan
Museums established in 2002
Museums in Hsinchu